The 1981 NCAA Division I Golf Championship was the 43rd annual NCAA-sanctioned golf tournament to determine the individual and team national champions of men's collegiate golf at the University Division level in the United States.

The tournament was held at the Stanford Golf Course in Stanford, California, hosted by Stanford University.

BYU won the team championship, the Cougars' first NCAA title.

Ron Commans, from USC, won the individual title.

Individual results

Individual champion
 Ron Commans, USC

Team results

DC = Defending champions
 Missed cut: Alabama, Fresno State, North Carolina, San Jose State, San Diego State, Centenary (LA), Stanford, Ohio State, LSU, Purdue, Oregon, New Mexico State, Temple, Oklahoma, Dartmouth
Debut appearance

References

NCAA Men's Golf Championship
Golf in California
NCAA Golf Championship
NCAA Golf Championship
NCAA Golf Championship